Pennsylvania House of Representatives District 160 includes parts of Chester County and Delaware County. It is currently represented by Republican Craig Williams.

District profile
The district includes the following areas:

Chester County:

 Birmingham Township
 Pennsbury Township
 Thornbury Township
 Westtown Township

Delaware County:

 Bethel Township
 Chadds Ford Township
 Chester Heights
 Concord Township
 Thornbury Township

Representatives

Recent election results

References

External links
District map from the United States Census Bureau
Pennsylvania House Legislative District Maps from the Pennsylvania Redistricting Commission.  
Population Data for District 160 from the Pennsylvania Redistricting Commission.

Government of Chester County, Pennsylvania
Government of Delaware County, Pennsylvania
160